Cheiron Studios was a recording studio located in the Kungsholmen district of Stockholm, Sweden. Founded in 1992 by Denniz PoP and Tom Talomaa, it was famous for being the place where popular music acts of the late 1990s/early 2000s such as Backstreet Boys, Boyzone, Robyn, NSYNC, Britney Spears, and Westlife, produced many of their greatest hits. In addition, Cheiron Studios was also a record label (Cheiron Records) in affiliation with BMG for a while, and a music publishing service (Cheiron Songs), although those ventures were abandoned in favour of music production.

After Denniz PoP's death in 1998, Cheiron closed in 2000. Talomaa and Max Martin reformed the company as Maratone, while Kristian Lundin and Jake Schulze formed The Location and David Kreuger and Per Magnusson started A Side Productions. The studio is currently owned by Roxy Recordings which also includes the Hanssonic Studios of Anders Hansson.

1986–92

In 1986 a group of ten Swedish disc jockeys founded "SweMix", a remix service, as a response to DiscoNet, Hot Tracks and DMC. Those included Denniz PoP (née Dag "Dagge" Volle), René Hedemyr (JackMaster Fax), Sten Hallström (StoneBridge), Emil Hellman (SoundFactory) and Johan Järpsten (JJ). At the beginning they were producing and distributed remixes of tracks without permission, so-called "bootlegs", for limited underground distribution on their newly founded Remixed Records.
Though being an underground collective, Remixed Records got noticed by, not only Scandinavia, but also Germany, Italy and The Netherlands. Tom Talomaa, a nightclub owner, got involved and supported the studio with more sophisticated equipment. Artists were dropping by SweMix to get a deal or a production. As a result of the requests, two labels were started: Basement Division for the underground and SweMix Records via Swedish Sonet for commercial records.

SweMix Records signed Swedish dance-acts like Dr. Alban, Kayo, Dayeene, Leila K. and had their first biggest hit with Dr. Alban's "Hello Afrika" (produced by Denniz PoP). In 1991 the company was divided and sold Remixed Records to Giovanni Sconfienza, who later converted it into a full-fledged label (releasing artists such as Solid Base and Sonic Dream Collective). The following year SweMix further split up into SweMix Productions and SweMix Records & Publishing. The latter was sold to BMG and taken over by Denniz PoP and Tom Talomaa, who renamed it Cheiron and began working in the studio in 1992. SweMix Productions, however, continued as a production company and a couple of months later StoneBridge made it famous with his remix of Robin S. – “Show Me Love”, which put Sweden on the international map of club music.

The Danish record company Mega Records sent Denniz PoP a demo tape by a then-unknown band called Ace of Base. The song on the tape was called "Mr. Ace" was written by American singer songwriter Angelo Negron and although at first Denniz was not particularly impressed, the tape got stuck in his car stereo so he ended up listening to it over and over until he said "I gotta do something with this" and the solution was to make a reggae tune out of it. It was recorded at the SweMix Studio by Denniz and was given a new title "All That She Wants". The track was an unexpected hit and catapulted both Ace of Base and Denniz PoP into stardom.

1992–2000

The SweMix collective and Denniz PoP parted ways due to creative differences. When Denniz started Cheiron with Douglas Carr, he started to bring in influences from other musical styles than dance music. Swedish artists like Leila K., Papa Dee, Rob'n'Raz and Herbie enjoyed success with him. Their initial attempts at publishing records and albums was a failure, as most of the records proved to be unsuccessful and financing music videos was too expensive. As such, they started to concentrate on what were their strengths: writing and producing songs. The requests for Denniz's services increased as more upcoming artists wanted his sound, skill and sense for what is working on the dance floor. To handle the offers he started to hire more people with the same approach. They began working with foreign artists in 1994 through Zomba, which was also owned by BMG.

Max Martin 
"I didn't even know what a producer did, "I spent two years day and night in that studio trying to learn what the hell was going on." – Max Martin, March 19, 2001

While Cheiron was still a record label, Denniz was seeking a heavier style. Talomaa had promised a Swedish glam-style metal band It's Alive a gig at Ritz, and offered a deal to release their second album Earthquake Visions and got Denniz to shape up the sound on the songs before the album's initial release. The members of the band stepped into the studio, nervous about the meeting with someone of Denniz's reputation. However, Denniz, who was never taught any instruments, fumbled among his papers for chords and found instructions showing him where to put his fingers on the keyboard. The members of It's Alive looked at each other and realized, "the guy had no idea about chords at all". The album failed to meet with any success but its frontman and singer at that time, Max Martin (who was going by the stage name "Martin White") was encouraged to continue and write songs.

Denniz had an ear for hit tunes and thought Martin wrote great songs. He then asked Martin if he could write songs for them instead and soon Martin joined Cheiron as an in-house producer. Their partnership proved to be successful, with their first collaboration, "Wish You Were Here" by Rednex, reaching #1 in several European countries.

Cheiron next hired the duo of John Amatiello and Kristian Lundin (collectively known as "Amadin") as songwriters and producers. They were already signed to Dr. Alban’s Dr. Records label and had floor hits through the Cheiron/Pitch Control AB label. David Kreuger and Per Magnusson joined the crew to produce music for various upcoming Swedish and major international artists.

1994 turned out to be a very successful year for Cheiron. Denniz and Amadin helped Dr. Alban to produce his third album Look Who's Talking!, which attained gold certification in Sweden. Denniz PoP set up a meeting with an ex-drummer and former host for ZTV Martin "E-Type" Eriksson. He agreed to produce the songs together with Max Martin and Amadin on his successful debut album Made in Sweden which included the #1 hits “Set the World on Fire” and “This is the Way.”

Backstreet Boys and beyond 
Those successes stimulated the Cheiron crew to progress and the following years would mark the studio's greatest achievements. Beginning in 1996 until its closure, Cheiron shared a joint production and publishing venture with the Zomba Group.  In 1995, Zomba had sent five young American men called the Backstreet Boys into the studio. Never having been to Europe, shy and uneven, they were willing to put their careers in Denniz's hands due to Ace of Base's American success. Kristian Lundin and Angelo Negron also collaborated on their eponymous debut album, which was released in 1996 and included the hits "We've Got It Goin' On" (written by Denniz PoP, Max Martin and Herbie Crichlow) and "Quit Playing Games (With My Heart), which went platinum and landed on #2 on the Billboard Hot 100

Cheiron next produced Ace of Base's second album The Bridge, Per Magnusson and David Kreuger produced DeDe’s debut album which became an instant hit especially in Japan. Denniz and Martin wrote two songs with Robyn for her debut album Robyn Is Here: "Do You Know (What It Takes)" and "Show Me Love". The latter ended up on the Billboard Top 10 and was the feature song in the Swedish movie Fucking Åmål (the English distribution borrowed the song’s title for the film due to the obscenity).

PoP/Martin produced Leila K.'s number one hit "Electric" with its chorus sung by Jessica Folcker. Army of Lovers also came by the studio to remix their hit "Sexual Revolution".

One of Denniz's dreams was to work with Michael Jackson and got his chance to work with him on Jackson’s nephews 3T's debut album Brotherhood.

The #1 Hit Factory 
In 1997, songwriter Andreas Carlsson was hired. The Irish group Boyzone approached Cheiron for material to put on their new album, "Where We Belong". Magnusson and Kreuger teamed up with songwriter Jörgen Elofsson, who had previously recorded his own music under the name “Shane”, to write the song, "Will Be Yours", the first of their many collaborations. Magnusson/Kreuger produced two tracks for the Danish group Michael Learns to Rock that were included on their 1999 "Greatest Hits" album: a new version of "The Actor" and "I'm Gonna Be Around".

In 1998, Cheiron Studios worked with new boy bands 5ive and NSYNC, and girl group Solid HarmoniE, and collaborated with Bryan Adams. The same year Denniz and Martin wrote songs for Swedish starlet Jessica Folcker, whose career began as a backing singer for Dr. Alban and Ace of Base and who became Denniz's girlfriend. Her debut album Jessica became an instant hit with singles like "Tell Me What You Like" and "How Will I Know (Who You Are)". Both singles sold platinum and got Folcker a Grammis nomination for Best Newcomer and Best Female Artist. That same year Denniz PoP received a "Special Grammis Award", shared with Max Martin, with the jury's "Special Honor Award", for their successes in restoring the world popularity of Swedish pop music and for making Sweden the third largest music exporting country in the world.

However, Denniz was in poor health and unable to attend the award ceremony, having been diagnosed with stomach cancer in November 1997.
Martin frequently visited him in the hospital to get feedback on his songs. One of those songs was "...Baby One More Time", originally written for TLC, who passed on it because they were on hiatus.

Death of Denniz PoP 
Cheiron's rise to international prominence was tempered by the death of its founder. Only 35 years old, Denniz succumbed to cancer on August 30, 1998. Max Martin took over as director of Cheiron Studios.

Britney Spears 
Martin started to work with writer/producer Rami Yacoub and Angelo Negron (main composer of such artists as Hawthorne Heights) in late 1998 to start production of the Backstreet Boys' next album Millennium. In the spring of 1998 Jive Records sent the studio and Martin a young American girl from Louisiana named Britney Spears, who was 16 years old and unknown at the time, to record a set of songs including "...Baby One More Time". Her debut album, titled the same as the song, was an international hit and became the best-selling LP by a teenager in history. The debut hit single remains Spears' signature song to this date. Both Millennium and ...Baby One More Time have been certified diamond (having sold more than ten million copies).

Celine Dion 
Celine Dion's song "That's the Way It Is" was written by Max Martin, Kristian Lundin, and Andreas Carlsson, and was included on All the Way… A Decade of Song released on November 12, 1999. Departing from her power ballads this was a little more “poppier” song that was the leadoff single for the seven new singles proceeded by a compilation of Dion's most successful hits. All the Way… A Decade of Song sold 17 million copies worldwide.

Westlife and final years 
Magnusson & Kreuger teamed up again with Jörgen Elofsson to work on the debut album of the new Irish boy band Westlife. Together they wrote three songs that appeared on their eponymous album. The song "If I Let You Go" was released in August and went immediately hit #1 on the UK Singles Chart. "Fool Again", included on the same album, also opened at #1 on the charts.

The year 2000 was a busy one for Cheiron. They were working with Britney Spears and her second album, Oops!… I Did It Again; the opening song with the same name was written and produced by Max Martin & Rami. The album broke another sales record beyond the 15 million for Spears' second straight mega success.

Westlife's recorded songs for their second album, Coast to Coast and the track "My Love" written and produced by Per Magnusson & David Kreuger was released in October and went straight to #1 in the UK. The Backstreet Boys had recorded another hit for their album Black & Blue: "Shape of My Heart" written by Lisa Miskovsky and Max Martin and Rami. The album became a huge international success and was certified platinum eight times over in the US alone.

Feeling they had accomplished their goals, Cheiron decided to close its doors. Talomaa and Martin wrote on the company web site, "Cheiron was created with the intention of having fun, making a few hits and not getting too serious about it. We feel the 'hype' of Cheiron has become bigger than [the studio] itself and it's time to quit while we're ahead."

Studio equipment
 Rack 1: AkaiS1000 with hundreds of commercial CDs
 Rack 2: EMU Proteus
 Controlroom 1: Euphonix CS3000D – 3 – 64
 Controlroom 2: Soundtracs Jade 32
 Controlroom 3: Yamaha 02R
 Editingroom: Power Macintosh G3, Pro Tools, Sound Designer, Masterlist CD
 Main Monitors: "Snake Speakers" S802
 Incredibly high monitor volume at mixing
 Hit lamp

Artists associated with Cheiron 

 5ive
 Ace of Base
 Army of Lovers
 Backstreet Boys
 Bon Jovi
 Boyzone
 Britney Spears
 Bryan Adams
 Celine Dion
 Dana Dragomir
 DeDe
 Dr. Alban
 E-Type
 Gary Barlow
 Jessica Folcker
 Leila K
 LFO
 M2M
 Meja
 Michael Learns to Rock
 NSYNC
 Rednex
 Robyn
 Solid HarmoniE
 Vacuum
 Westlife

The Cheiron staff 
Denniz PoP (1993–1998)
Herbie Crichlow (1993–1999)
Douglas Carr (1993–1995)
Max Martin (1994–2000)
Kristian Lundin (1994–2000)
John Amatiello (1994–2000)
Per Magnusson (1994–2000)
David Kreuger (1994–2000)
Alexander Kronlund (1995–2000)
Andreas Carlsson (1996–2000)
Jake Schulze (1996–2000)
Rami Yacoub (1997–2000)
Jörgen Elofsson (1997–2000)
Alexandra Talomaa (1997–2000)

Awards and nominations 
Swedish Dance Music Awards 1995 for Best Producer (Denniz PoP)
Swedish Dance Music Awards 1996 for Best Producers (Denniz PoP & Max Martin)
Swedish Grammis Special Award in 1997 (Denniz PoP & Max Martin)
Swedish Grammis Nomination in 1997 for Composer of the Year (Max Martin & Andreas Carlsson)
Swedish Grammis Special Award in 1999 (Cheiron Productions)
ASCAP's Songwriter of the Year in 1999 (Max Martin)
ASCAP's Songwriter of the Year in 2000 (Max Martin)
ASCAP's Songwriter of the Year in 2001 (Max Martin)

References 
 Reportage about Denniz Pop "Pojken med Guldskivorna", by Christer Berglund for  Café Magazine, January 1999, Nr. 1

External links 
Official Website Archived
HitQuarters article on Cheiron and its ongoing influence on modern pop

Buildings and structures in Stockholm
Recording studios in Sweden
Music in Stockholm